Shady Grove is an unincorporated community in Franklin County, in the U.S. state of Pennsylvania.

History
Shady Grove was platted in 1848. A post office has been in operation at Shady Grove since 1852. An old variant spelling was "Shadygrove".

References

Unincorporated communities in Franklin County, Pennsylvania
Unincorporated communities in Pennsylvania